Alexander Leck Brown Downie (8 October 1876 – 9 December 1953) was a Scottish footballer who played as a wing half. He was born in Glasgow, and played for Glasgow Perthshire and Third Lanark, before moving to England to play for Bristol City in the 1890s. He then joined Swindon Town before moving to Manchester United in October 1902.

He was able to play in all three half-back positions, and thus earned a regular first-team spot at Old Trafford even after being replaced by Dick Duckworth. He made ten appearances in 1907–08 as the Red Devils won the Football League championship and played in 23 of the league fixtures of the following season but did not take any part in the two-legged 1908 FA Charity Shield at its start, nor in the 1909 FA Cup Final at its end. In 1909, after scoring 14 goals in 191 appearances for United, he moved to Oldham Athletic. In the 1909–10 season, he skippered the Latics to promotion to the First Division. He later played for Crewe Alexandra and Nelson.

References

1876 births
Scottish footballers
Footballers from Glasgow
Bristol City F.C. players
Swindon Town F.C. players
Manchester United F.C. players
Oldham Athletic A.F.C. players
Crewe Alexandra F.C. players
Nelson F.C. players
People from Dunoon
1953 deaths
Scottish Football League players
English Football League players
Southern Football League players
Scottish Junior Football Association players
Glasgow Perthshire F.C. players
Association football wing halves
Third Lanark A.C. players
Sportspeople from Argyll and Bute